The Asia/Oceania Zone was one of the three zones of the regional Davis Cup competition in 1999.

In the Asia/Oceania Zone there were four different tiers, called groups, in which teams compete against each other to advance to the upper tier. Winners in Group II advanced to the Asia/Oceania Zone Group I. Teams who lost their respective ties competed in the relegation play-offs, with winning teams remaining in Group II, whereas teams who lost their play-offs were relegated to the Asia/Oceania Zone Group III in 2000.

Participating nations

Draw

 and  relegated to Group III in 2000.
 promoted to Group I in 2000.

First round

Qatar vs. Indonesia

Philippines vs. Chinese Taipei

Sri Lanka vs. Iran

Thailand vs. Kazakhstan

Second round

Indonesia vs. Philippines

Iran vs. Thailand

Relegation play-offs

Chinese Taipei vs. Qatar

Kazakhstan vs. Sri Lanka

Third round

Thailand vs. Philippines

References

External links
Davis Cup official website

Davis Cup Asia/Oceania Zone
Asia Oceania Zone Group II